The Keeper of the Bees is a 1925 American silent drama film written and directed by James Leo Meehan. It is based on the 1925 novel The Keeper of the Bees by Gene Stratton-Porter. The film stars Robert Frazer, Josef Swickard, Martha Mattox, Clara Bow, Alyce Mills, and Gene Stratton. The film was released on September 6, 1925, by Film Booking Offices of America.

Plot
James Lewis MacFarlane, a World War I hero, has been spending his post-war days in government hospitals, having his war wounds healed by the best doctors. However, he soon learns that he has only one year to live. With this information, James decides to leave the hospital, and his only hope for an unlikely recovery, to spend his last year experiencing the world. James meets The Bee Master along the way, an old veteran who lives alone and takes care of hundreds of bees. When The Bee Master falls ill, James is trusted to take care of the bees while The Bee Master is away. While The Bee Master is away James meets the bees’ other caretaker, Little Scout, an 11 year old boy. James meets a young woman by the waterside, who is about to drown herself due to getting pregnant out of wedlock, and they soon get married. Upon getting married, his wife disappears and leaves a note signed “Alice Louise MacFarlane”. With the help of a neighbor, Margaret Cameron, James’ wounds heal and he regains his health. The Bee Master eventually succumbs to his illness, leaving James and Little Scout to care for the bees. When Little Scout reacts to The Bee Master’s passing, Little Scout is revealed to be a girl dressing and acting as a boy. Soon after The Bee Master’s death, James gets a call saying that his wife has had a child. He rushes to the hospital only to find another woman in bed wearing the ring he gave his “wife”. This woman, Alice Louise, dies in childbirth, and the woman he actually married, Molly Cameron (Margaret Cameron’s daughter) shows up and reveals that she married James under her sister’s name to protect her reputation. In the end, James remarries Molly and they live together, taking care of the bees with Little Scout and Alice’s child.

Cast

References

External links

1925 films
1920s English-language films
Silent American drama films
1925 drama films
Film Booking Offices of America films
American silent feature films
American black-and-white films
Films based on works by Gene Stratton-Porter
Films directed by James Leo Meehan
Films based on American novels
1920s American films